North Carolina Highway 461 (NC 461) is a primary state highway in the U.S. state of North Carolina. Its western terminus is at NC 561, passes through Winton and Cofield, and has its eastern end at an entrance to a Nucor steel plant east of Cofield.

Route description

NC 461 is a two-lane rural highway that begins at NC 561 in Saint John, and travels northeast, crossing NC 11 and having a concurrency with U.S. Route 13 (US 13). Following its split from US 13, it travels to NC 45 in Winton.  From Winton, and in concurrency with NC 45, it travels through Cofield, then splits just east of the village.  It continues north on Farmers Chemical Road, then east on River Road, ending at the entrance of Nucor Plate Mill, Hertford.

History
NC 461 was established in 1964 as a new primary routing from NC 561 in Saint John to US 13 south of Winton.  In 1999, NC 461 was extended east, with a short concurrency with US 13 it splits near Winton, where it follows along Old Highway 13 to NC 45, then in concurrency until Farmers Chemical Road, where it continues as a new primary spur to the steel plant.

Junction list

References

External links

 
 NCRoads.com: N.C. 461

461
Transportation in Hertford County, North Carolina